is a 2013 Japanese film directed by Nobuhiro Yamashita and starring former AKB48 member Atsuko Maeda. The film had its world premiere at the 2013 Busan International Film Festival and was released in Japan on 23 November 2013.

Plot 
Tamako is an unemployed university graduate living with her divorced father, who runs a sports equipment shop. Tamako spends her time sleeping, eating, watching TV, reading manga, and playing video games. She is disdainful of her father, who is fond of her, but wants her to find a job. He often comes home drunk, full of affection, and buys her expensive gifts, which she demands he return.

With the help of a local boy, Tamako has an amateur photoshoot and secretly applies for an idol group. Her father finds out, embarrassing her.

Tamako learns that her father is dating a local teacher. She attends her accessory making class to learn more about her. They strike up conversation, and the woman realises who she is, trying to make friends. After Tamako complains to her about her father, the woman tells her she is mean.

Cast
 Tamako Sakai - Atsuko Maeda
 Yoshitsugu Sakai - Suon Kan
 Jin - Seiya Ito
 Keisuke Sakai - Keiichi Suzuki
 Yoshiko Sakai - Kumi Nakamura
 Yoko - Yasuko Tomita

Reception
It was ranked number nine in the top ten best Japanese films of 2013 by Kinema Junpo. The Japanese Professional Movie Awards ranked it at 6th place in its Best 10 2013 rankings.

Awards
 23rd Japanese Professional Movie Awards - Best Actress

References

External links
Official Website (Japanese language)

Films directed by Nobuhiro Yamashita
2010s Japanese films